Major is a rank in the Sri Lanka Army. The rank insignia for a major is the Sri Lankan emblem. It ranks below lieutenant colonel and above captain. The equivalent is Lieutenant-Commander in the Sri Lanka Navy and Squadron Leader in the Sri Lanka Air Force.

From 1949 to 1972, in the Ceylon Army the rank insignia for a major was a crown, similar to the of the British Army Major.

A major of the Sri Lanka Army would usually commanding independent companies, squadrons and batteries, but those that were organically part of a regiment or battalion were still usually commanded by captains. They would be second-in-command of battalions in infantry or regiments (in the artillery and armoured regiments) as well as serve as Brigade majors. During the Sri Lankan Civil War majors commanded area commands known as military sectors and have commanded battalions in combat.

In 1947, at its formation the uniform of the Serjeant-at-arms of the Sri Lankan Parliament was molded on uniforms of a major.

Notable majors  
G. S. Jayanath - Parama Weera Vibhushanaya recipient 
K. A. Gamage - Parama Weera Vibhushanaya recipient 
E. A. Nugawela - first Cabinet Minister of Education of Ceylon, later Cabinet Minister of Health, a Member of Parliament and State Council.
Montague Jayawickrama - Government Ministers and Provincial Governor
L. V. Gooneratne, ED - Mayor of Dehiwala - Mt Lavinia
Bevis Bawa, ADC, CLI - former Aide-de-camp to the Governor of Ceylon
Victor Gunasekara, CCS - former Controller of Imports Exports and Government Agent of Kegalle
Deshamanya Duncan White, MBE, ED - first Ceylonese athlete to win an Olympic medal
Wickremasinghe Wimaladasa - Asian games (Tehran) 400 metres gold medalist.

See also
List of Sri Lankan Generals
Sri Lanka Army rank insignia
Sri Lanka Navy rank insignia
Sri Lanka Air Force rank insignia
Sri Lanka Army
Military of Sri Lanka
Comparative military ranks
Military rank

References
Army, Sri Lanka. (1st Edition - October 1999). "50 YEARS ON" - 1949-1999, Sri Lanka Army.

External links 
Sri Lanka Army
Ministry of Defence, Public Security, Law & Order - Democratic Socialist Republic of Sri Lanka
Three Service Commanders promoted : Official Government News Portal 

Military ranks of the Sri Lanka Army